Crambus leucoschalis is a moth in the family Crambidae. It was described by George Hampson in 1898. It is found in South Africa, where it has been recorded from Gauteng.

References

Endemic moths of South Africa
Crambini
Moths described in 1898
Moths of Africa